The Orpheus Sinfonia is an orchestra based in London. Established in 2009, it is formed of recent music conservatoire graduates and provides experience and support for young musicians develop their professional careers. It is under the artistic direction of international cellist and conductor Thomas Carroll.

Orpheus Sinfonia is the resident orchestra at St George’s Hanover Square in London and regularly makes appearances throughout the UK with recent notable venues including Royal Festival Hall, London Coliseum, Queen Elizabeth Hall, Hackney Empire, and Windsor Castle, most recently for HM The Queen's Platinum Jubilee Celebrations. The orchestra specialises in delivering wide-ranging high-level performances incorporating symphonic repertoire, world premières, curated and bespoke programmes, children’s interactive performances, workshops and introductions, choral works, and orchestra live to film and opera. 

Orpheus has recently worked with performers such as with Dame Felicity Lott, Tasmin Little, Heinrich Schiff and their patron, Sir Antonio Pappano. The orchestra performed festivals including Windsor, Cheltenham, Newbury, Hampstead and Cambridge, welcomed soloists such as Sir Roderick Williams, Anne Sophie Duprels, Brindley Sherratt, Bryan Hymal and Jack Liebeck and toured The Snowman live to film at Christmas in 2018 and in 2019 for the 40th anniversary tour, alongside their programme of core concerts in London. The Orpheus Sinfonia has also featured on BBC Radio 3, BBC World Service, Times Radio and released its debut CD on Signum Classics. 

Since 2017 Orpheus Sinfonia has been the Official Orchestra of The International Opera Awards.

Orpheus Sinfonia is a registered charity (under the name Orpheus Sinfonia Foundation) and has received government grants as well as donations from the public. Orpheus Sinfonia's patrons are Sir Antonio Pappano and Dame Judi Dench.

Notes

2009 establishments in England
London orchestras